Three ships of the United States Navy have borne the name Ability.

 , was a yacht used for anti-submarine warfare during World War II.
 , was the lead ship of the s.
 , was a small auxiliary floating dry dock.

References

United States Navy ship names